Ninho (born 1996) is a French rapper of Congolese descent.

Ninho can also refer to:

Ninho da Garça, an alternative name for Estádio Municipal Professor Dario Rodrigues Leite
Ninho do Urubu meaning "The Vulture's Nest", or Centro de Treinamento George Helal, is the training ground and youth team headquarters of Brazilian football club Flamengo

See also
El Niño (disambiguation)